Vermont v. New Hampshire, 289 U.S. 593 (1933), was a United States Supreme Court case holding that the boundary between Vermont and New Hampshire is neither the thread of the channel of the Connecticut River nor the top of the west bank of the river, but rather the west bank of the river at the mean low-water mark.

History of the boundary dispute 
An Order-in-Council signed by King George III on July 20, 1764, said that the boundary between New Hampshire and New York is the west bank of the river. The order was intended to settle a dispute between New York and New Hampshire in which each claimed the territory that later became the state of Vermont. The disputed territory had been governed for 15 years as a de facto part of New Hampshire, but the king's order awarded it to New York. On January 15, 1777, Vermont issued its declaration of independence, creating the independent Vermont Republic. On August 20 and 21, 1781, Congress expressed conditions that must be met before the then-still unrecognized but de facto independent state could be admitted into the Union. Among the conditions was that Vermont must give up its claims to territory east of the river. On February 22, 1782, Vermont's legislature complied, and the Supreme Court's opinion in 1933 cited that act.

"Perambulation" by the two attorneys general 

In order to assure compliance with the Supreme Court's ruling, in 1935 the legislatures of Vermont and New Hampshire enacted laws requiring the attorneys general of those two states to meet at the river once every seven years to reaffirm their mutual understanding of the location of the boundary.

References

External links
 

United States Supreme Court cases
United States Supreme Court cases of the Hughes Court
United States Supreme Court original jurisdiction cases
United States water case law
Geography of Vermont
Politics of Vermont
Geography of New Hampshire
Politics of New Hampshire
Geography of the United States

Borders of U.S. states
Internal territorial disputes of the United States